The canton of Vic-en-Bigorre is an administrative division of the Hautes-Pyrénées department, southwestern France. Its borders were modified at the French canton reorganisation which came into effect in March 2015. Its seat is in Vic-en-Bigorre.

It consists of the following communes:
 
Andrest
Artagnan
Aurensan
Caixon
Camalès
Escaunets
Gayan
Lagarde
Marsac
Nouilhan
Oroix
Pintac
Pujo
Saint-Lézer
Sanous
Sarniguet
Siarrouy
Talazac
Tarasteix
Vic-en-Bigorre
Villenave-près-Béarn
Villenave-près-Marsac

References

Cantons of Hautes-Pyrénées